François David (October 14, 1870 - October 1, 1939), an ethnic Assyrian, was the Chaldean Catholic Bishop of Amadiyah in Iraq.

He was consecrated as bishop by Chaldean Patriarch Yousef VI Emmanuel II Thomas on August 15, 1910. He became the principal consecrator of French Archbishop Antonin Drapier of the Latin Rite, who later became  the Apostolic Delegate to French Indochina, and ordained some bishops there. The Chaldean lineage therefore includes a few members of the Latin Rite episcopate in Vietnam.

 Bishop François Daoud (David) †

1870 births
1939 deaths
Iraqi Eastern Catholics
Chaldean bishops
French people of Assyrian descent